The 67th annual Berlin International Film Festival was held from 9 to 18 February 2017 with Dutch filmmaker Paul Verhoeven as President of the Jury. Django, directed by Etienne Comar, opened the festival. The Golden Bear was awarded to the Hungarian film On Body and Soul directed by Ildikó Enyedi, which also served as closing film of the festival.

Jury

Main Competition

The following people were on the jury for the Berlinale Competition section:

International jury
 Paul Verhoeven, film director and screenwriter (Netherlands) - Jury President
 Olafur Eliasson, sculptor (Iceland)
 Dora Bouchoucha Fourati, producer (Tunisia)
 Maggie Gyllenhaal, actress (United States)
 Julia Jentsch, actress (Germany)
 Diego Luna, actor and film director (Mexico)
 Wang Quan'an, film director and screenwriter (China)

Best First Feature Award Jury

The following people were on the jury for the Best First Feature Award:

 Jayro Bustamante, film director (Guatemala)
 Clotilde Courau, actress (France)
 Mahmoud Sabbagh, filmmaker, producer, and writer (Saudi Arabia)

Documentary Award Jury
The following people were on the jury for the Berlinale Documentary film award:

 Daniela Michel, film critic (Mexico)
 Laura Poitras, director and producer (United States)
 Samir, director and producer (Iraq)

International Short Film Jury
The following people were on the jury for the Berlinale Shorts section:

 Kimberley Drew, writer, curator and social media manager (United States)
 Christian Jankowski, artist and filmmaker (Germany)
 Carlos Nuñez, film producer (Chile)

In competition
The following films were selected for the main competition for the Golden Bear and Silver Bear awards:

Out of competition
The following films were selected to be screened out of competition:

Panorama
The following films were selected for the Panorama section:

Panorama Dokumente
The following films were selected for the Panorama Dokumente section:

Perspektive Deutsches Kino
The following films were selected for the Perspektive Deutsches Kino section:

Berlinale Special
The following films were selected for the Berlinale Special section:

Key
{| class="wikitable" width="550" colspan="2"
| style="text-align:center;"| *
|LGBTQ feature; eligible for the Teddy Award
|}

Awards
The following prizes were awarded:

 Golden Bear – On Body and Soul by Ildikó Enyedi
 Silver Bear Grand Jury Prize – Félicité by Alain Gomis
 Alfred Bauer Prize (Silver Bear) – Spoor by Agnieszka Holland
 Silver Bear for Best Director – Aki Kaurismäki for The Other Side of Hope
 Silver Bear for Best Actress – Kim Min-hee for On the Beach at Night Alone
 Silver Bear for Best Actor – Georg Friedrich for Bright Nights
 Silver Bear for Best Script – Sebastián Lelio and Gonzalo Maza for A Fantastic Woman
 Silver Bear for Outstanding Artistic Contribution – Dana Bunescu for editing in Ana, mon amour
 GWFF Best First Feature Award (50.000 €) – Estiu 1993 by Carla Simón
 Golden Bear for Best Short Film – Cidade Pequena by Diogo Costa Amarante
 Silver Bear for Best Short Film – Esteban Arrangoiz Julien for Ensueño en la Pradera
 Panorama Audience Award 
 1st Place: Insyriated by Philippe Van Leeuw
 2nd Place: Close-Knit by Naoko Ogigami
 3rd Place: 1945 by Ferenc Török
 Panorama Audience Award – Documentaries (Panorama Dokumente)
 1st Place: I Am Not Your Negro by Raoul Peck
 2nd Place: Chavela by Catherine Gund and Daresha Kyi
 3rd Place: Ghost Hunting by Raed Andoni
 Teddy Award
 Best Feature Film: A Fantastic Woman by Sebastián Lelio
 Best Documentary-/Essay Film: Small Talk by Hui-chen Huang
 Best Short Film: My Gay Sister by Lia Hietala
 Special Jury Award: Close-Knit by Naoko Ogigami
 Special Teddy Award: Monika Truet
 FIPRESCI Prize
 Competition: On Body and Soul by Ildikó Enyedi
 Panorama: Pendular by Júlia Murat
 Forum: A Feeling Greater Than Love by Mary Jirmanus Saba
 Prize of the Ecumenical Jury
 Competition: On Body and Soul by Ildikó Enyedi
 Special Mention: A Fantastic Woman by Sebastián Lelio
 Panorama: Investigating Paradise by Merzak Allouache
 Special Mention: I Am Not Your Negro by Raoul Peck
 Forum: Mama Colonel by Dieudo Hamadi
 Special Mention: El Mar La Mar by Joshua Bonnetta and J.P. Sniadecki
 CICAE Art Cinema Award
 Panorama: Centaur by Aktan Abdykalykov
 Forum: Newton by Amit V. Masurkar
 Generation 14Plus 
 Best Film: Butterfly Kisses by Rafael Kapelinski
 Special Mention: Those Who Make Revolution Halfway Only Dig Their Own Graves by Mathieu Denis and Simon Lavoie
 Crystal Bear for Best Short Film: Wolfe by Claire Randall
 Special Mention Short Film: Snip by Terril Calder
 Generation KPlus 
 The Grand Prix of the Generation 14plus International Jury for Best Film: Shkola nomer 3 by Yelizaveta Smith and Georg Genoux
 Special Mention: Ben Niao by Huang Ji and Ryuji Otsuka
 Special Prize of the Generation 14plus International Jury for the Best Short Film: The Jungle Knows You Better Than You Do by Juanita Onzaga
 Special Mention Short Film: U Plavetnilo by Antoneta Alamat Kusijanović
 Berliner Morgenpost Readers' Jury Award
 Prize Winner: On Body and Soul by Ildikó Enyedi
 Tagesspiegel Readers' Jury Award
 Prize Winner: Mama Colonel by Dieudo Hamadi
 Harvey-Manner Readers' Jury Award
 Prize Winner: God's Own Country by Francis Lee
 Guild Film Prize
 Prize Winner: The Party by Sally Potter
 Caligari Film Prize 
 Prize Winner: El mar la mar by Joshua Bonnetta and J.P. Sniadecki
 Heiner Carow Prize 
 Prize Winner: Five Stars by Annekatrin Hendel
 Compass-Perspektive-Award 
 Prize Winner: The Best of All Worlds by Adrian Goiginger
 Kompagnon-Fellowship
 Perspektive Deutsches Kino: Der grüne Wellensittich by Levin Peter and Elsa Kremser
 Berlinale Talents: System Crasher by Nora Fingscheidt
 ARTE International Prize
 Prize Winner: Lost Country by Vladimir Perišić
 Eurimages Co-Production Development Award
 Award Winner: Razor Film Produktion for The Wife of the Pilot
 VFF Talent Highlight Award
 Award Winner: Nefes Polat for The Bus to Amerika
 Film Prize of the Robert Bosch Stiftung for International Cooperation Germany / Arab World
 Animation Film: Night by Ahmad Saleh
 Short Film: The Trap by Nada Riyadh
 Documentary Film: Behind Closed Doors by Yakout Elhababi
 Amnesty International Film Prize
 Prize Winner: Devil's Freedom by Everardo González

References

External links

Berlin International Film Festival

67
2017 film festivals
2017 in Berlin
2017 festivals in Europe
2017 in German cinema